Morris Wells are a series of natural springs in eastern Aberdeenshire, Scotland. This water source has historically been a water supply for the town of Peterhead.

See also
 Laeca Burn
 Catto Long Barrow

Line notes

References
 William Ferguson (1881) The Great North of Scotland Railway: A Guide, publisher: D. Douglas, Digitized 13 Aug 2007, 174 pages
 C. Michael Hogan (2008) Catto Long Barrow fieldnotes, The Modern Antiquarian

Springs of Scotland
Landforms of Aberdeenshire